is located in the eastern area of Toyama Prefecture, Japan. It is one of the 100 Famous Japanese Mountains, and is called "the most dangerous mountain" climbable.

Tsurugi has a number of routes which approach world class long routes. It is recognised in Japan as "the" premiere mountaineering peak in winter. Although dangerous, its death toll is a small fraction of those who have died on Japan's much smaller, but more lethal Tanigawa-dake.

See also

 List of mountains in Japan
 100 Famous Japanese Mountains
 Hida Mountains
 Chūbu-Sangaku National Park

References

Hida Mountains
Japan Alps
Mountains of Toyama Prefecture